Art & Soul is an album by pianist Renee Rosnes which was recorded in 1999 and released on the Blue Note label.

Reception

The AllMusic review by Ken Dryden stated "Renee Rosnes' sixth Blue Note CD shows her stretching well past her hard bop roots ... Highly recommended". On All About Jazz, David Adler noted "Whereas previous outings have stressed Rosnes’s own compositions, this disc contains only two originals—and they happen to be my two favorite cuts".

Track listing
All compositions by Renee Rosnes except where noted
 "Blues Connotation" (Ornette Coleman) – 6:25
 "With a Little Help from My Friends" (John Lennon, Paul McCartney) – 6:18
 "Goodbye" (Gordon Jenkins) – 5:36
 "Ancient Footprints" (Wayne Shorter, Kitty Margolis) – 8:24
 "Fleurette Africaine" (Duke Ellington) – 6:23
 "Romp" – 5:40
 "Lazy Afternoon" (Jerome Moross, John La Touche) – 5:12
 "Little Spirit" – 5:17
 "Sanfona" (Egberto Gismonti) – 3:48
 "Children's Song, No. 3" (Béla Bartók) – 5:20

Personnel
Renee Rosnes – piano 
Scott Colley – bass 
Billy Drummond – drums 
Richard Bona – percussion (tracks 4 & 5)
Dianne Reeves – vocals (tracks 4 & 7)

References

Renee Rosnes albums
1999 albums
Blue Note Records albums